Deshret ( was the Red Crown of Lower Egypt. When combined with the Hedjet (White Crown) of Upper Egypt, it forms the Pschent (Double Crown), in ancient Egyptian called the sekhemti.

The Red Crown in Egyptian language hieroglyphs eventually was used as the vertical letter "n" . The original "n" hieroglyph from the Predynastic Period and the Old Kingdom was the sign depicting ripples of water.

The word Deshret also referred to the desert Red Land on either side of Kemet (Black Land), the fertile Nile river basin.

Significance
In mythology, the earth deity Geb, original ruler of Egypt, invested Horus with the rule over Lower Egypt. The Egyptian pharaohs, who saw themselves as successors of Horus, wore the deshret to symbolize their authority over Lower Egypt. Other deities wore the deshret too, or were identified with it, such as the protective serpent goddess Wadjet and the creator-goddess of Sais, Neith, who often is shown wearing the Red Crown.

The Red Crown would later be combined with the White Crown of Upper Egypt to form the Double Crown, symbolizing the rule over the whole country, "The Two Lands" as the Egyptians expressed it.

Records
No Red Crown has been found. Several ancient representations indicate it was woven like a basket from plant fiber such as grass, straw, flax, palm leaf, or reed.

The Red Crown frequently is mentioned in texts and depicted in reliefs and statues. An early example is the depiction of the victorious pharaoh wearing the deshret on the Narmer Palette. A label from the reign of Djer records a royal visit to the shrine of the Deshret which may have been located at Buto in the Nile delta.

The fact that no crown has ever been found buried with any of the pharaohs, even in relatively intact tombs, might suggest that it was passed from one reign to the next, much as in present-day monarchies.

Toby Wilkinson has cited the iconography on rock art in the Eastern Desert region as depicting what he interpreted to be among the earliest representations of the royal crowns and suggested the Red Crown could have originated in the southern Nile Valley.

Phonogram

Deshret, the ancient Egyptian Red Crown, is one of the oldest Egyptian hieroglyphs. As an iconographic element, it is used on the famous palette of Pharaoh Narmer as the "Red Crown of the Delta", the Delta being Lower Egypt.

The first usage of the Red Crown was in iconography as the symbol for Lower Egypt with the Nile Delta, horizontal letter 'n', Gardiner no. 35, N35 Later it came to be used in the Egyptian language as an alphabetic uniliteral, vertical form for letter "n" as a phoneme or preposition. It became functional in running hieroglyphic texts, where either the horizontal or vertical form preposition satisfied space requirements.

Both the vertical and horizontal forms are prepositional equivalents, with the horizontal letter n, the N-water ripple (n hieroglyph) being more common, as well as more common to form parts of Egyptian language words requiring the phoneme 'n'.

One old use of the red crown hieroglyph is to make the word:  'in'!, (formerly an-(a-with dot)-(the "vertical feather" hieroglyph a, plus the red crown). Egyptian "in" is used at the beginning of a text and translates as: Behold!, or Lo!, and is an emphatic.

The Red Crown is also used as a determinative, most notably in the word for deshret. It is also used in other words or names of gods.
Use in the Rosetta Stone
 
In the 198 BC Rosetta Stone, the  'Red Crown'  as hieroglyph has the usage mostly of the vertical form of the preposition "n". In running text, word endings are not always at the end of hieroglyph blocks; when they are at the end, a simple transition to start the next block is a vertical separator, in this case the preposition, vertical n, (thus a space saver).

Since the start of the next hieroglyphic block could also be started with a horizontal "n" at the bottom of the previous block, it should be thought that the vertical "n" is also chosen for a visual effect; in other words, it visually spreads out the running text of words, instead of piling horizontal prepositions in a more tight text. Visually it is also a hieroglyph that takes up more 'space'-(versus a straight-line type for the horizontal water ripple); so it may have a dual purpose of a less compact text, and a better segue-transition to the next words.

The Red Crown hieroglyph is used 35 times in the Rosetta Stone; only 4 times is it used as a non-preposition. It averages once per line usage in the 36 line Decree of Memphis (Ptolemy V)-(Rosetta Stone).

See also

 Atef – Hedjet Crown with feathers identified with Osiris
 Khepresh – Blue or War Crown also called Royal Crown

Gallery

References

 Budge.  An Egyptian Hieroglyphic Dictionary, E.A.Wallace Budge, (Dover Publications), c 1978, (c 1920), Dover edition, 1978. (In two volumes) (softcover)
 Budge.  The Rosetta Stone, E.A.Wallace Budge, (Dover Publications), c 1929, Dover edition(unabridged), 1989. (softcover)

Lower Egypt
Crowns (headgear)
Rfff
Egyptian artefact types
Egyptian hieroglyphs
Wadjet